Edwin Herbert Land, ForMemRS, FRPS, Hon.MRI (May 7, 1909 – March 1, 1991) was a Russian-American scientist and inventor, best known as the co-founder of the Polaroid Corporation. He invented inexpensive filters for polarizing light, a practical system of in-camera instant photography, and the retinex theory of color vision, among other things. His Polaroid instant camera went on sale in late 1948 and made it possible for a picture to be taken and developed in 60 seconds or less.

Life and career 

Edwin Land was born to Jewish parents in Bridgeport, Connecticut, to Matie and Harry Land, a Russian scrap-metal dealer. Growing up, he was known to take apart household appliances, such as a mantel clock and the family's new gramophone, as well as blowing all the house's fuses when he was six years old. He was scolded by his father when taking apart a phonograph and he vowed that
"nothing or nobody could stop me from carrying through the execution of an experiment"  He had an elder sister named Helen who had a difficult time pronouncing Edwin's name, so she called him "Din" a nickname that stuck throughout the rest of his childhood and was used among his closest friends.

Land attended the Norwich Free Academy at Norwich, Connecticut, a semi-private high school, and graduated in the class of 1927 with honors. The library there was posthumously named for him, having been funded by grants from his family.

He studied physics at Harvard University, more specifically, optics, but left after his freshman year, moving to New York City. There he invented the first inexpensive filters capable of polarizing light, which he called Polaroid film. He was not associated with an educational institution and lacked the tools of a proper laboratory, making this a difficult endeavor, so he would sneak into a laboratory at Columbia University late at night to use their equipment. He also availed himself of the New York Public Library to scour the scientific literature for prior work on polarizing substances. His breakthrough came when he realized that, instead of attempting to grow a large single crystal of a polarizing substance, he could manufacture a film with millions of micron-sized polarizing crystals that were coaxed into perfect alignment with each other.

Land returned to Harvard University after developing the polarizing film, but he did not finish his studies or receive a degree. Despite not receiving a college degree, he was still referred to from many as Dr. Land especially when he set up visiting posts to Harvard and Massachusetts Institute of Technology. According to biographer Peter Wensberg, once Land could see the solution to a problem in his head, he lost all motivation to write it down or prove his vision to others. Often his wife would extract from him the answers to homework problems, at the prodding of his instructor. She would then write up the homework and hand it in so that he could receive credit and not fail the course.

Polaroid

In 1932, he established the Land-Wheelwright Laboratories together with his Harvard physics professor, George Wheelwright III, to commercialize his polarizing technology. Wheelwright came from a family of financial means and agreed to fund the company. After a few early successes developing polarizing filters for sunglasses and photographic filters, Land obtained funding from a series of Wall Street investors for further expansion.

The company was renamed the Polaroid Corporation in 1937.

Land further developed and produced the sheet polarizers under the Polaroid trademark. Although the initial major application was for sunglasses and scientific work, it quickly found many additional applications: for color animation in the Wurlitzer 850 Peacock jukebox of 1942, for glasses in full-color stereoscopic (3-D) movies, to control brightness of light through a window, a necessary component of all LCDs, and many more.

During World War II, he worked on military tasks, which included developing dark-adaptation goggles, target finders, the first passively guided smart bombs, and a special stereoscopic viewing system called the Vectograph, co-invented with Czech refugee Joseph Mahler, which revealed camouflaged enemy positions in aerial photography. With all this, he was also a consultant to the National Research Defense Committee which focused its efforts on non-governmental scientific research.

In a vacation to Santa Fe, New Mexico, with his three-year-old eldest daughter, Jennifer, he took a picture of her. She asked why she could not see the picture her father just took of her, within an hour, he already had the idea for the SX-70 Polaroid camera. His patent attorney, Donald Brown, was also there at the time visiting Santa Fe and he quickly approached him with this idea and Brown agreed on the idea. After this trip, research for the development of this idea began immediately.

A little more than three years later, on February 21, 1947, Land demonstrated an instant camera and associated film to the Optical Society of America. Called the Land Camera, it was in commercial sale less than two years later. Polaroid originally manufactured sixty units of this first camera. Fifty-seven were put up for sale at the Jordan Marsh department store in Boston before the 1948 Christmas holiday. Polaroid marketers incorrectly guessed that the camera and film would remain in stock long enough to manufacture a second run based on customer demand. All fifty-seven cameras and all of the film were sold on the first day of demonstrations.

During his time at Polaroid, Land was notorious for his marathon research sessions. When Land conceived of an idea, he would experiment and brainstorm until the problem was solved with no breaks of any kind. He needed to have food brought to him and to be reminded to eat. He once wore the same clothes for eighteen consecutive days while solving problems with the commercial production of polarizing film. As the Polaroid company grew, Land had teams of assistants working in shifts at his side. As one team wore out, the next team was brought in to continue the work.

Elkan Blout, a close colleague of Edwin Land at Polaroid, wrote: "What was Land like? Knowing him was a unique experience. He was a true visionary; he saw things differently from other people, which is what led him to the idea of instant photography. He was a brilliant, driven man who did not spare himself and who enjoyed working with equally driven people."

Contributions to photo intelligence
Beginning in the early years of the Cold War, Land played a major role in the development of photographic reconnaissance and intelligence gathering efforts. Projects included the Genetrix balloon borne cameras, the U-2 program, Corona and Samos photographic satellites, and the Manned Orbiting Laboratory. He was a frequent advisor to President Dwight D. Eisenhower on photographic reconnaissance matters.

Later years
In the 1950s, Land and his team helped design the optics of the revolutionary Lockheed U-2 spy plane. He also contributed to the design of the plane with Kelly Johnson. Also in this decade, Land first discovered a two-color system for projecting the entire spectrum of hues with only two colors of projecting light (he later found more specifically that one could achieve the same effect using very narrow bands of 579 nm and 599 nm light). Some of this work was later incorporated in his Retinex theory of color vision.

In 1957, Harvard University awarded him an honorary doctorate, and Edwin H. Land Blvd., a street in Cambridge, Massachusetts, was later named in his memory. The street is at one end of Memorial Drive, in Cambridge, where the Polaroid company headquarters building was located (over a mile west on Memorial Drive from Land Blvd.). Polaroid occupied several buildings in various places in Cambridge.

In the early 1970s, Land attempted to explain the previously known phenomenon of color constancy with his retinex theory. His popular demonstrations of color constancy raised much interest in the concept. He considered his leadership towards the development of integral instant color photography — the SX-70 film and camera — to be his crowning achievement.

Although he led the Polaroid Corporation as a chief executive, Land was a scientist first and foremost, and as such made sure that he performed "an experiment each day". Despite holding no formal degree, employees, friends, and the press respected his scientific accomplishments by calling him Dr. Land. The only exception was The Wall Street Journal, which refused to use that honorific title throughout his lifetime.

Land often made technical and management decisions based on what he felt was right as both a scientist and a humanist, much to the chagrin of Wall Street and his investors. From the beginning of his professional career, he hired women and trained them to be research scientists. Following the assassination of Martin Luther King Jr. in 1968, he led Polaroid to the forefront of the affirmative action movement.

He had an artistic vision. In his laboratory, he built giant studio cameras the size of bedroom closets that produced large format (20 x 24 inch) prints. He gave photographers free access to these cameras in return for some of the prints they produced. This practice was continued by the company; the result was the Polaroid Collection. Compiled since the 1970s, the collection grew to between 16,000 and 24,000 photos shot by some of the world's greatest artists and photographers, including Ansel Adams, Chuck Close, Robert Frank and Andy Warhol. The collection, an asset of the Polaroid Corporation, remained intact until 2010 when, in controversial circumstances, it was broken up and put up for sale in lots.

Land resigned from his role as Presidential Advisor during Nixon's Watergate scandal in 1973. He was one of the names in Nixon's "political opponents" (following the original top 20 enemies)

Despite the tremendous success of his instant cameras, Land's Polavision instant movie system was a financial disaster, and he resigned as Chairman of Polaroid on July 27, 1982. When he retired, he had 535 patents to his name, only surpassed by Thomas Edison and Elihu Thomson. While he was set for retirement years, this did not mean the end of his passion in research and decided to continue with his interest in color vision. In this time, Land founded the Rowland Institute for Science where he found a vacant lot besides Charles River at Kendall Square.

Death
Land died on March 1, 1991, in Cambridge, Massachusetts, at the age of 81. Land's family, his wife, Helen, and two daughters, Jennifer and Valerie declined to disclose the cause of his death. Land himself disliked being written about, wanting to leave behind a legacy of published scientific work, rather than a cult of personality, and so, on his death, Land's family had a laboratory associate shred his personal papers and notes, a task that would take three years to complete.

He is buried in Mount Auburn Cemetery in Cambridge, Massachusetts.

Public service
Land was:
 A member of the President's Science Advisory Committee (PSAC) 1957–59 and a Consultant-at-Large of PSAC from 1960 to 1973.
 A member of the President's Foreign Intelligence Advisory Board (PFIAB) 1961–77.
 A member of the National Commission on Technology, Automation and Economic Progress 1964–66.
 A member of the Carnegie Commission on Educational Television 1966–67.
 A Trustee of the Ford Foundation 1967–1975.

Honors

 1935 Hood Medal of the Royal Photographic Society of Great Britain
 1938 Elliott Cresson Medal, Franklin Institute of Philadelphia
 1940 National Modern Pioneer Award, National Association of Manufacturers
 1943 elected to the American Academy of Arts and Sciences
 1945 Rumford Medal, American Academy of Arts and Sciences
 1948 Holley Medal, American Society of Mechanical Engineers
 1949 Duddell Medal, Physical Society of Great Britain
 1953 elected to the United States National Academy of Sciences
 1956 Howard N. Potts Medal
 1957 elected to the American Philosophical Society
 1963 Presidential Medal of Freedom, the highest award given to a U.S. citizen, for his work in optics.
 1965 IRI Medal from the Industrial Research Institute
 1966 Albert A. Michelson Award from the Case Institute of Technology
 1967 Frederic Ives Medal by the Optical Society of America.
 1967 National Medal of Science
 1967 The Cultural Award from the German Society for Photography (DGPh), with Henri Cartier-Bresson
 1972 Founders Medal, National Academy of Engineering
 1974 Vermilye Medal
 1977 inducted into the National Inventors Hall of Fame
 1988 National Medal of Technology for "the invention, development and marketing of instant photography".
 1991 inducted into the International Photography Hall of Fame and Museum
 Although Land never received a formal degree, he received honorary degrees from Harvard University, Yale University, Columbia University, Carnegie Mellon University, Willams College, Tufts College, Washington University in St. Louis, Polytechnic Institute of Brooklyn, University of Massachusetts, Brandeis University and many others.
 He held 535 patents, compared with Thomas Edison's 1,097 American patents.
 Land's development of instant photography was designated a National Historic Chemical Landmark by the American Chemical Society on August 13, 2015.

Bibliography

Notes

References

Sources
 Earls, Alan R. and Rohani, Nasrin (2005), Polaroid Arcadia Publishing, Charleston, S.C., 
 Wensberg, P. C. (1987) Land's Polaroid: a company and the man who invented it Houghton Mifflin, New York, 
 McElheny, Victor K. (1999) Edwin Herbert Land: May 7, 1909 – March 1, 1991 National Academy Press, Washington, D.C.,

Further reading 
 Bonanos, Christopher, New York Times: "Man who inspired Apple's Steve Jobs", The New York Times, October 7, 2011
 McElheny, Victor K., "BIOGRAPHICAL MEMOIRS: Edwin Herbert Land May 7, 1909 — March 1, 1991", National Academies Press
 "Generation of Greatness: The Idea of a University in an Age of Science", Ninth Annual Arthur Dehon Little Memorial Lecture at the Massachusetts Institute of Technology. May 22, 1957

External links 

 Land with Self Photo

Patents
 —Apparatus for exposing and processing photographic film

1909 births
1991 deaths
20th-century American inventors
Jewish American scientists
American chief executives
Corporate executives
National Medal of Technology recipients
National Medal of Science laureates
Presidential Medal of Freedom recipients
Businesspeople from Bridgeport, Connecticut
Polaroid Corporation
Color scientists
Businesspeople from Massachusetts
Foreign Members of the Royal Society
Burials at Mount Auburn Cemetery
American technology company founders
20th-century American businesspeople
Jewish American inventors
Harvard University people
20th-century American Jews
Members of the American Philosophical Society